Ellen Barry (born 12 February 1989 in Christchurch) is a New Zealand former professional tennis player. 

Her career-high WTA singles ranking was 253, which she reached on 26 May 2008, best doubles ranking was 467, achieved on 23 June 2008. Barry won one ITF singles title on the ITF Women's Circuit.

ITF Circuit finals

Singles: 3 (1–2)

Doubles: 1 (0–1)

References
 Semi At Sorrento for Ellen, 23 March 2008
 Rankings Boost for Ellen Barry, 17 March 2008
 Ellen Equals Career Best Win, 15 March 2008
 Barry Through To First ITF Singles Final, 8 March 2008
 Two Kiwis In Semis at Hamilton, 7 March 2008
 ASB Classic Profile on Ellen Barry & other Contenders, January 2008

External links
 
 
 

1989 births
Living people
New Zealand female tennis players
Sportspeople from Christchurch
21st-century New Zealand women